Ping Zhang is a mathematician specializing in graph theory. She is a professor of mathematics at Western Michigan University and the author of multiple textbooks on graph theory and mathematical proof.

Zhang earned a master's degree in 1989 from the University of Jordan, working there on ring theory with Hasan Al-Ezeh.
She completed her Ph.D. in 1995 at Michigan State University. Her dissertation, in algebraic combinatorics, was Subposets of Boolean Algebras, and was supervised by Bruce Sagan.

After a short-term position at the University of Texas at El Paso, she joined the Western Michigan faculty in 1996.

Books
Zhang is the author of:
Mathematical Proofs: A Transition to Advanced Mathematics (with Gary Chartrand and A. D. Polimeni, Addison-Wesley, 2002; 2nd ed., 2007; 3rd ed., 2012)
Introduction to Graph Theory (with Gary Chartrand, McGraw-Hill, 2004; Chinese ed., 2006); revised as A First Course in Graph Theory (Dover, 2012)
Chromatic Graph Theory (with Gary Chartrand, CRC Press, 2008)
Graphs & Digraphs (by Gary Chartrand and Linda Lesniak, with Zhang added as a co-author on the 5th ed., CRC Press, 2010)
Discrete Mathematics (with Gary Chartrand, Waveland Press, 2011)
Covering Walks in Graphs (with Futaba Fujie, Springer, 2014)
Color-Induced Graph Colorings (Springer, 2015)
The Fascinating World of Graph Theory (with Arthur T. Benjamin and Gary Chartrand, Princeton University Press, 2015)
A Kaleidoscopic View of Graph Colorings (Springer, 2016)
How to Label a Graph (with Gary Chartrand and Cooroo Egan, Springer, 2019)

She is also the co-editor of:
Handbook of Graph Theory (originally edited by Jonathan L. Gross and Jay Yellen, with Zhang added as a co-editor on the 2nd ed., CRC Press, 2013)

References

Year of birth missing (living people)
Living people
20th-century American mathematicians
21st-century American mathematicians
American women mathematicians
Graph theorists
University of Jordan alumni
Michigan State University alumni
University of Texas at El Paso faculty
Western Michigan University faculty
20th-century women mathematicians
21st-century women mathematicians
20th-century American women
21st-century American women